Anna Wierzba (born 19 July 2000) is a Danish handball player for Toulon Saint-Cyr Var Handball and the Danish national junior team.

She also represented Denmark in the 2017 European Women's U-17 Handball Championship, 2018 Women's Youth World Handball Championship, and in the 2019 Women's Junior European Handball Championship, placing 6th all three times.

She has previously played for the AGF Håndbold, Aarhus United and Skanderborg Håndbold.

References

2000 births
Living people
Sportspeople from Aarhus
Danish female handball players